Herman Kristoffersson (4 November 1895 – 23 April 1968) was a Swedish equestrian. He competed in vaulting at the 1920 Summer Olympics, but failed to finish.

References

1895 births
1968 deaths
Olympic equestrians of Sweden
Swedish male equestrians
Equestrians at the 1920 Summer Olympics
People from Svedala Municipality
Sportspeople from Skåne County